Ramada is a former civil parish in the municipality of Odivelas, Portugal. In 2013, the parish merged into the new parish Ramada e Caneças. It covers an area of 3.86 km² and had a population of 15,770 as of 2001.

References

Former parishes of Odivelas